Blue Velvet was the soundtrack of the film of the same name. It included original music by composer and conductor, Angelo Badalamenti. It was released in 1986 on Varèse Sarabande.  

The soundtrack is a dark combination of classic composition and vintage/modern pop songs, which mirrors the film's un-stated timeless setting envisioned by director David Lynch and unsettling neo-noir atmosphere. 

Thus, the film has become noted for its diverse musical selections. Seen as a prominent stylistic feature in the film is also the unconventional use of vintage pop songs, such as Bobby Vinton’s "Blue Velvet" and Roy Orbison’s "In Dreams", juxtaposed with an orchestral score.

Badalamenti's score alludes to Shostakovich's 15th Symphony, which Lynch had been listening to regularly while writing the screenplay.

Background and music
Lynch worked with Badalamenti for the first time in this film and asked him to write a score that had to be “like Shostakovich, be very Russian, but make it the most beautiful thing but make it dark and a little bit scary.” Badalamenti would later go on to contribute to all of Lynch's future full-length films except for Inland Empire (2006).

Inspired by This Mortal Coil's recent cover of Tim Buckley's "Song to the Siren", Lynch had wanted Isabella Rossellini to sing her own version, but was unable to secure the rights. In its place, Badalamenti composed a music for "Mysteries of Love" with lyrics by Lynch and Julee Cruise sang it.

Bobby Vinton's cover of The Clovers' 1950s song "Blue Velvet" served as inspiration for the film and heavily incorporated it.

Legacy
Entertainment Weekly ranked Blue Velvet at #100 on their list of the 100 Greatest Film Soundtracks: "The haunting soundtrack accompanies the title credits, then weaves through the narrative, accentuating the noir mood of the film."'' — Critic John Alexander

Track listing
 "Main Title" 1:27 
 "Night Streets/Sandy and Jeffrey" 3:42 
 "Frank" 3:34 
 "Jeffrey's Dark Side" 1:48 
 "Mysteries of Love" 2:10 
 "Frank Returns" 4:39 
 "Mysteries of Love" [Instrumental] 4:41 
 "Blue Velvet/Blue Star" 3:14 
 "Lumberton U.S.A./Going Down to Lincoln" 2:13 
 "Akron Meets the Blues" 2:40 
 Bill Doggett - "Honky Tonk, Pt. 1" 3:09 
 Roy Orbison - "In Dreams" 2:48 
 Ketty Lester - "Love Letters" 2:36 
 Julee Cruise - "Mysteries of Love" 4:22

Personnel 
 Angelo Badalamenti – Composer, Conductor, Contractor
 Julee Cruise – Performer
 Carmine d'Amico – Guitar, Guitar (Electric), Contractor
 Chris d'Amico – Bass (Electric)
 Bill Doggett – Organ, Performer
 Dan Hersch – Digital Editing, Digital Transfers
 Richard Kraft – Executive Producer
 Ketty Lester – Performer
 David Lynch – Conductor
 Roy Markowitz – Drums
 Tom Null – Executive Producer
 Roy Orbison – Performer
 Wayne Sabella – Piano
 Jiri Sobac – Engineer

Releases 
The first official release (on LP, tape and CD) was released in late 1986. The following release was on an audio CD on October 15, 1990 by Varèse Sarabande. It, however, did not feature the original rendition title song as many times as it was used in the movie.

References 

1980s film soundtrack albums
1986 soundtrack albums
Varèse Sarabande soundtracks
Angelo Badalamenti soundtracks